is a Japanese manga series written and illustrated by Akira Toriyama. It was serialized in Weekly Shōnen Jump magazine from May to August 2000, and was collected into one tankōbon volume in November 2000 by Shueisha. Sand Land was serialized in North America by Viz Media in their English Shonen Jump magazine in 2003. It was later released in one graphic novel in December 2003. A CGI anime adaptation co-produced by Sunrise, Kamikaze Douga and Anima will be released in 2023.

Plot
After enduring years of natural disaster and war, the world is left without its main supply of water; the river that provided water to the country dried up long ago. With the greedy king of the land's personal water supply becoming increasingly more expensive for the citizens of Sand Land to buy, the people begin robbing one another for water and money. Sheriff Rao, tired of the king's greed, approaches the demons of Sand Land for help in searching for a new water supply. Demon prince Beelzebub and his friend Thief agree to join Rao.

Soon after their quest begins, their car breaks down and they are forced to steal a tank from the king's army. This attracts the anger of the king and he mobilizes his forces to stop them. Sheriff Rao, a former legendary general of the king's army, is able to quickly deal with all of the current army's attempts to hinder their progress. Once they reach the supposed water supply at the end of the now dried up river bed, they find a lake that now acts as the king's private reserves. With the water sealed away behind a dam to give the king a monopoly over water, Rao, the demons, and those sympathetic to their cause tear it down. With the water returned to the world as a result, the king's oppressive rule is brought to an end.

Characters

Beelzebub, named after the biblical demon of the same name, is the son of Lucifer. He is renowned as the "Prince of the Underworld," but generally referred to only as "Prince" by his fellow demons. Beelzebub tries to live in relative harmony with the humans. Although he regularly steals water from them, he only takes as much as he and his fellow demons need to survive. Simply joining Sheriff Rao out of boredom, Beelzebub lends his enhanced sight and demonic strength to fight against the tyrannous king.

An elderly man, Rao seeks to free the people of Sand Land from the king's pocket. As he travels with Beelzebub and Thief, he learns that the weapon was not actually a weapon at all, instead a machine to artificially create water. Rao sets to right his wrong by bringing down the king and helping those whose family died due to his actions.

Thief is recruited by Beelzebub for his expertise at stealing and his great wisdom. He often fights with Beelzebub for turns to drive the tank.

Rao's replacement in the king's army, Are's father died during the raid against the mysterious weapon. Initially, he actively pursues Rao in order to avenge his father. However, once he learns the truth about the mysterious weapon he joins Rao in bringing down the king.

The true antagonist of Sand Land, Zeu is the aging commander of the King's forces. Due to his failing body, Zeu is confined to a floating robotic lift. He ordered the attack on the Picchi people, the creators of the water-producing machine, to both rid himself of Shiba's disobedient tank brigade and the threat to the king's monopoly. He uses the king as a figurehead to rule Sand Land. Ultimately, Are shoots and kills him with a tank cannon blast.

As the current ruler of Sand Land the king makes enormous profit by selling bottled water at high prices. He tries to eliminate Rao to make sure nobody finds out about his personal water supply or the water-creating machine he had destroyed. After water is returned to Sand Land, he is forced by Rao to give his wealth to the people.

Production
Toriyama intended for Sand Land to be a short story about a man and a tank that he wrote for his own enjoyment. However, he had difficulty drawing the tank and, as Toriyama insisted on drawing everything himself, soon regretted it. Although he became frustrated, he had already devised the plot and thus was forced to go through with it.

Publication
Written and illustrated by Akira Toriyama, Sand Land was serialized in Weekly Shōnen Jump magazine from issue #23 published on May 22, 2000 to #36–37 on August 28, 2000. The fourteen chapters were collected into one tankōbon volume that was released on November 2, 2000. Viz Media licensed Sand Land for English release in North America. It was serialized in their manga anthology magazine Shonen Jump for eleven issues, from its debut January 2003 issue to November 2003. The collected graphic novel was released in paperback on December 24, 2003, and digitally as an ebook on June 4, 2013. It was also published in many other countries, such as France by Glenat, Spain by Planeta DeAgostini, Italy by Star Comics, Germany by Carlsen Comics and in their Banzai! magazine, Denmark by Rasmus Klump, Brazil by Conrad, Finland by Sangatsu Manga, Sweden by Bonnier Carlsen, and in Mexico by Grupo Editorial Vid.

Chapter list

Media

Anime
On December 8, 2022, Bandai Namco opened a website for "Sand Land Project" and uploaded a teaser video featuring Toriyama's art from the manga. The website features a countdown that would end on December 17, when more details about the project would revealed. On that date, it was announced that it will receive a CGI anime adaptation co-produced by Sunrise, Kamikaze Douga and Anima, which will be released in 2023.

Reception
Greg McElhatton called Sand Land "the ultimate disposable comic, executed perfectly". His review for Read About Comics summarized, refers to it as a fun light story that, while not necessarily deep or memorable, does well to explore the fictional world and the unique characters that inhabit it. Despite Toriyama's complaints about designing the tank, McElhatton praised the art, declaring it more consistent than his previous work Dragon Ball. John Jakala of Anime News Network also called the artwork, and story, superior to Dragon Ball. Jakala said the characters are a big part of the series' charm, claiming Toriyama did a "masterful job" establishing the look and personality of each character in the first chapter.

References

External links
 
 

2000 manga
2023 anime
Adventure anime and manga
Akira Toriyama
Comedy anime and manga
Science fiction anime and manga
Shōnen manga
Shueisha manga
Sunrise (company)
Viz Media manga
Water scarcity in fiction